In algebraic geometry, the -conjecture gives a particularly simple formula for certain integrals on the Deligne–Mumford compactification  of the moduli space of curves with marked points. Later, it was proven by  using virtual localization in Gromov–Witten theory.

Let  be positive integers such that:

Then the -formula can be stated as follows:

 

The -formula in combination withge

References 

Algebraic curves
Moduli theory